Premonición is the third studio album by David Bisbal that was released on 3 October 2006. By 9 October it was certified 5× platinum for shipping 400,000 copies in Spain.

Notable events
The following took place in 2006:

 On 2 October the full album was leaked on the Internet.
 In the first week of Spanish sales, Premonición sold more than 400,000 copies.
 On 12 October, in Florida, a representative of Universal Music presented a Golden Disc in recognition of 100,000 copies sold in USA (Latin).
 On 13 October, in the official Billboard 200, Premonición debuted at No. 150 with 6,771 units sold.

Track listing

CD
 "¿Quién Me Iba a Decir?" (Kike Santander) – 3:39
 "Silencio" (Santander) – 3:31
 "Como La Primera Vez" (David Bisbal, Santander) – 4:01
 "Torre de Babel (Reggaeton Mix)" (featuring Vicente Amigo y Wisin & Yandel) (Santander) – 4:18
 "Amar Es Lo Que Quiero" (David Demaría) – 3:30
 "Soldado De Papel" (Bisbal, Mauricio Gasca, Rafael Vergara) – 4:08
 "Premonición" (Bisbal, Santander) – 4:07
 "Cuidar Nuestro Amor (I'll Never Let You Go)" (Bisbal, Christina Christian, Christian Leuzzi, Emanuel Olsson) – 3:47
 "Calentando Voy (I'm Just Warmin' Up)" (Filipol Carrins, D. Clench, Eric Sanicola) – 3:40
 "Qué Tendrás" (Daniel Betancourt, Bisbal) – 4:04
 "Amanecer Sin Tí" (Bisbal, Leuzzi, Vergara) – 3:59
 "Aquí y Ahora" (Bisbal, Mauricio Gasca, Vergara) – 4:05
 "Torre de Babel (db Original Mix)" (Santander) – 3:12
 "Torre de Babel (Wisin & Yandel Remix)" (Santander) – 4:22

German Bonus
 Ave María (2007) – 3:31
 Bulería – 4:13

iTunes Bonus
 Cry For Me – 3:32
 Stop Loving You – 3:38
 The Sun Ain't Gonna Shine (Anymore) – 3:09

DVD
 Making of Grabación Album "Premonición" [DVD]
 Grabació de La Canción "Quién Me Iba a Decir" [DVD]
 Entrevista a David Bisbal: El Disco [DVD]
 Entrevista a David Bisbal: Los Productores [DVD]
 Entrevista a David Bisbal: Las Canciones [DVD]
 Entrevista a David Bisbal: Bonus Track [DVD]
 Quién Me Iba a Decir [Videoclip] [DVD]
 Making of Grabación Videoclip [DVD]

Charts and certifications

Charts

Certifications

See also
Premonición Live

References

2006 albums
David Bisbal albums